Huntsville (established 2006 in Oslo, Norway) is an experimental jazz trio.

Biography 
Huntsville was formed by three Norwegian veterans of creative jazz music, the guitarist Ivar Grydeland, bassist Tonny Klutten and percussionist Ingar Zach. They perform their instruments in unorthodox manners and then manipulated their sounds to obtain the post-modern reinvention of folk, jazz, raga and drone music for their debut album For The Middle Class ( 2006). Here we may note the 15 minute tune "The Appearance Of A Wise Child" and the 22 minute tune "Add A Key Of Humanity". Their music is described as energetic and intense, and they have played a variety of concerts internationally and in Norway.

Band members 
Ivar Grydeland – guitars, banjo, pedal steel guitar and various instruments
Ingar Zach – percussion, tabla machine, sarangi box, sruti box, drone commander and various instruments
Tonny Kluften – electric bass, double bass, bass pedals and various instruments

Discography 
2006: For The Middle Class (Rune Grammofon)
2008: Eco, Arches & Eras (Rune Grammofon)
2011: For Flowers, Cars And Merry Wars (Hubro Music)
2011: Splashgirl / Huntsville (Hubro Music), with Splashgirl
2013: Past Increasing, Future Receding (Hubro Music)
2015: Pond (Hubro Music)
2020: Bow Shoulder (Hubro Music)

References

External links 

Huntsville live in Oslo, 09 (part 1) on YouTube
Huntsville live in Oslo, 09 (part 2) on YouTube

Norwegian electronic music groups
Norwegian jazz ensembles
Norwegian experimental musical groups
Norwegian rock music groups
Musical groups established in 2006
Musical groups from Oslo
Hubro Music artists